Dr. Péter Tóth (12 July 1882 – 28 February 1967) was a Hungarian fencer who competed at the 1906 Intercalated Games and at the 1908, 1912 and 1928 Olympics. He won team gold medals in sabre in 1908 and 1912, finishing fifth-sixth individually; he won an individual bronze medal in the sabre three hits event in 1906. In 1928 he placed fifth in the team foil. Domestically Tóth won 17 Hungarian foil and sabre titles between 1907 and 1934, and competed until 1937.

Tóth was a founding member of Fédération Internationale d'Escrime in 1913. He died in Budapest, aged 84, after being hit by a truck.

References

External links
 
 
 
 

1882 births
1967 deaths
Fencers from Budapest
Road incident deaths in Hungary
Hungarian male foil fencers
Olympic fencers of Hungary
Fencers at the 1906 Intercalated Games
Fencers at the 1908 Summer Olympics
Fencers at the 1912 Summer Olympics
Fencers at the 1928 Summer Olympics
Olympic gold medalists for Hungary
Olympic bronze medalists for Hungary
Olympic medalists in fencing
Medalists at the 1906 Intercalated Games
Medalists at the 1908 Summer Olympics
Medalists at the 1912 Summer Olympics
Hungarian male sabre fencers